Nyctemera groenendaeli is a moth of the family Erebidae first described by Rob de Vos in 1994. It is found in New Guinea.

References

Nyctemerina
Moths described in 1994